Zainal Abedin is a Communist Party of India (Marxist) politician and was four-time MP.

Early life
Zainal Abedin, son of Wareshtullah Mandal, was born on 29 October 1938 at Kabilpur in Murshidabad district.

A graduate in humanities and education, he was educated at Jangipur College and Union Christian Training College at Baharampur.

He married Rubeda Begum in 1957 and they had five sons.

Political career
He unsuccefully contested the Lalgola seat for the state assembly in 1977.

He was elected to the Lok Sabha from Jangipur in 1980, 1984, 1989 and 1991.

References 

People from Murshidabad district
Communist Party of India (Marxist) politicians from West Bengal
1938 births
Lok Sabha members from West Bengal
India MPs 1980–1984
India MPs 1984–1989
India MPs 1989–1991
India MPs 1991–1996
2014 deaths
20th-century Bengalis
21st-century Bengalis